Burgstaller is a surname. Notable people with the surname include:

Alois Burgstaller (1871–1945), German-Austrian singer
Gabi Burgstaller (born 1963), Austrian politician
Peter Burgstaller (1964–2007), Austrian footballer
Guido Burgstaller (born 1989), Austrian footballer
Thomas Burgstaller (born 1980), Austrian footballer